WBEM 1350 AM is a former American radio station, first going on the air May 18, 1964.  Its community of license had been Windber, Pennsylvania.  This station's last owner had been Jotocon Communications, which took over operations in 1989, but the station would go silent in 1991 and its license was cancelled in 1996.

History
Originally known as WWBR, the station signed on May 18, 1964 from studios and offices at 1311 Midway Avenue in its then-city of license of Windber, and under the ownership of Windber Community Broadcasting System.  Dr. E.Z. Epperjessy served as company president, and George Ledney served as the station's first general manager.

First sale

In January 1975, the station was sold by Windber Community Broadcasting System to WWBR, Inc.  Louis Popp served as company president and general manager.

Station operations were moved to 1724 Scalp Avenue, in Richland Township, overlooking the city of Johnstown, in 1979.  The following year, the station increased its power from 1,000 to 2,500 watts non-directional, but still retained its daytime-only status.

Second and third sales

One of this station's owners was legendary Pittsburgh radio and television newscaster Hank Baughman, who left his job as anchorman of WPXI-TV's 11 o'clock news in June 1985, to purchase his own station.  Doing business as Baughman Media, Inc., the station was airing mostly MOR music from 10-inch tape reels from Drake-Chenault's music library.  Not long after his arrival, Baughman changed the call letters to WBEM and affiliated the station with the ABC Talkradio network, airing a mixture of both local and national talk.

Unforeseen circumstances shortened Baughman's tenure of ownership, resulting in the station's sale to Greater Johnstown Radio, Inc. in August 1986. Baughman returned to Pittsburgh, where he took a job with WSHH, and remains there today.   Greater Johnstown Radio, Inc. was headed by David Rod Wolf, who owned Altoona-based WRTA.  Because Johnstown and Altoona were separate radio markets despite both cities being in a combined television market, the transaction still met FCC ownership limits.

Final sale and demise

WBEM was unable to prosper, and on April 1, 1989, the station was sold again, this time to Jotocon Communications.  WBEM had fallen on hard times over the years, largely due to the collapse of Johnstown's lucrative local coal and steel-based economy, which had a domino effect on retail business in the area.  Because the landscape was already dominated with high and medium-powered FM stations now too in a period of hardship, WBEM found itself in a weak position to compete as a strict daytime-only station.

WBEM finally fell silent in 1991, around the time its license was set to expire, which was August 1.  Its studio building was then cleared out of all of its equipment, with all traces of a radio station's existence removed, including its broadcast tower.  The station did not formally forfeit its license, and it was ultimately cancelled under terms outlined in the Telecommunications Act of 1996.

Aftermath
In January 2004, the FCC received an application for a new station to broadcast at 1350 kHz from Southwest Pennsylvania Community Radio, LLC; owned by Michael Horvath, of North Huntingdon, Pennsylvania.  Horvath had owned two previous radio stations in the Pittsburgh radio market, known then as WXVX (now WPGR) Monroeville and WPLW (later WZUM) Carnegie, which he had acquired in the mid-1990s before selling both in the early years of the 21st century.  Prior to selling both, Horvath had invested substantially in new directional antenna arrays, making them more palatable to prospective buyers.

Unlike its predecessor, the succeeding station would have been licensed to Geistown, Pennsylvania, located just east of the Johnstown city limits.  Another application was received in July 2007 to modify the application, which also included antenna diagrams for building the new six-tower directional antenna system and its proposed operational pattern.  On September 2, 2010, the construction permit to build the new station on this frequency was formally cancelled.

External links
 Query FCC database for New AM Geistown
 Query FCC database for WBEM Windber

BEM
Defunct radio stations in the United States
Radio stations established in 1964
1964 establishments in Pennsylvania
Radio stations disestablished in 1991
1991 disestablishments in Pennsylvania
BEM
BEM